Slattocks is a proposed railway station in Castleton, Greater Manchester.

The station is a proposal by Transport for Greater Manchester to support land development at Stakehill. The station is considered as part of TfGM's "Rochdale-Station Alliance Enhancement Programme".

References

Proposed railway stations in England
Railway stations in the Metropolitan Borough of Rochdale